The Lancashire Heeler is a small breed of dog developed for use as a drover and herder of cattle. The Lancashire Heeler is listed by the Kennel Club (UK) as an endangered breed.

Description

Appearance
The coat is harsh and smooth with an undercoat which keeps the dog dry in all weathers. It may have a slight mane round the neck in winter. The dog is usually black and tan, but liver and tan is now recognised by the Kennel Club. Ears can be tipped or erect.

Personality

It is alert, friendly, energetic, intelligent, playful and a pleasant companion. Personality can range from lazy and playful to energetic and talkative. It is generally a very strong dog that likes to participate in a variety of activities, and can carry a ball or object the size of itself. The Lancashire Heeler is friendly towards its owners and passers-by on the street but may be aggressive towards an unknown character on their territory.

Health
The Lancashire Heeler has a life expectancy of 12–15 years or more. The three most common serious conditions that can affect Heelers are Collie eye anomaly, Primary lens luxation and Persistent pupillary membranes. As well as these eye conditions, dogs of this breed may suffer from Patella luxation.

History 

The origin of breed are unknown, however it is accepted that a type of Welsh Corgi was used to drive livestock to the north west of England from Wales. In the Ormskirk area, a type of black and tan terrier called the Manchester Terrier was introduced which resulted in what is now known as the Lancashire Heeler. The breed has been known in its home county for over a hundred and fifty years as a general purpose farm dog, capable of both ratting and herding cattle.

Gwen Mackintosh began to breed Heelers in the early 1960s. Together with other enthusiasts, she established the Lancashire Heeler Club  in 1978, with the club setting a breed standard and register. Recognition by The Kennel Club followed in 1981. Mackintosh would continue to serve as the club's president until her death in 1992.

The breed was recognised as a vulnerable native breed by The Kennel Club in 2006, which means that annual registration figures are 300 or less for the breed. In 2006, 173 Heelers were registered in the UK, in 2007 this had decreased further to 146. In 2016, the FCI added the breed to the list of provisionally accepted breeds.

Activities
Lancashire Heelers can compete in dog agility trials, obedience, Rally obedience, showmanship, flyball, and herding events. Herding instincts and trainability can be measured at noncompetitive herding tests. Lancashire Heelers exhibiting basic herding instincts can be trained to compete in herding trials.

See also
 Dogs portal
 List of dog breeds

References

External links
 

Dog breeds originating in England
FCI breeds
Herding dogs
Rare dog breeds
Vulnerable Native Breeds